Torpantau railway station is a station in the Welsh county of Brecknockshire (now in Powys), and the northern terminus of the narrow gauge Brecon Mountain Railway.

It had previously been a station on the standard gauge line from Merthyr to Brecon, and was the highest station on the Brecon and Merthyr Railway.

The standard gauge and narrow gauge stations are in the same broad location, but on different specific sites, on opposite sides of the Torpantau to Abercynafon road.

History

The station was opened at the end of 1862 by the Brecon and Merthyr Tydfil Junction Railway. Torpantau is a remote location, though a few passengers may have worked on the local dams, or fished there for leisure. The location was most significant in operational terms for watering engines and tying down brakes before a descent.

In 1916 a train passed a signal at danger near the station causing a collision that killed two people.

The line and the station first became part of the Great Western Railway (GWR) during the grouping of 1923, and then part of British Railways (BR) in 1948, following the nationalisation of the railways consequent upon the Transport Act 1947.

Torpantau closed to passengers in December 1962, but the line was retained for freight workings to Brecon until 4 May 1964. The route was subsequently abandoned, and the track lifted.

Torpantau Tunnel 
To the north of the station lies Torpantau Tunnel (also known as Beacons Tunnel), through the Beacons pass. The tunnel is 666 yards (609m) long, and the south-west portal (railway mileage 14miles-2¾ chains from Brecon station) was reached after a three-mile (5 km) ascent from the Merthyr side. Exiting from the tunnel (13 miles-52¼ chains from Brecon station) to the south-east, the line descended for 6¾ miles along the side of Glyn Collwyn (now flooded to form a reservoir) and on to the former Talybont-on-Usk station and River Usk at Talybont. Thence it climbed to Pennorth and Talyllyn junction and on to Brecon.

Though access is discouraged, the tunnel remains accessible on foot. East and west portals of the tunnel are Grade II listed building.

Re-opened station 
From the late 1970s, the Brecon Mountain Railway (BMR) began relaying 2 ft-gauge track along the original railway route, northwards from Pant. The line re-opened to  Pontsticill in 1980, and to Dolygaer in 1995. Re-laying continued, and the line reached Torpantau in December 2000. For operational and access reasons, Torpantau station was rebuilt slightly south of the original site, on the opposite side of the road. The nearby original station site is a popular start point for walks in the Brecon Beacons. It lies on the National Cycle Network NCR 8 (Taff Trail).

Due to motive power constraints on the steeply graded trackbed, the extended line from Dolygaer to Torpantau, a distance of 1mile-35chains, was used only by engineering trains from 2000 to 2014, whilst the BMR worked to restore a more powerful steam locomotive. Having achieved this aim, the extension to Torpantau became operational on 1 April 2014. Torpantau station reopened on that date, and is now the railway's northern terminus.

References

Further reading

External links
Photographs
Signalbox track diagram

Railway stations in Powys
Former Brecon and Merthyr Tydfil Junction Railway stations
Railway stations in Great Britain opened in 1863
Railway stations in Great Britain closed in 1962
Railway stations in Great Britain opened in 2014